Khijadiya Junction Railway Station is a junction railway station in Khijadiya, Amreli district. Its station code is KJV. It is under Bhavnagar railway division of Western Railway Zone of Indian Railways.

References

Railway stations in Amreli district
Railway junction stations in Gujarat